Night smelt (Spirinchus starksi) is a true smelt of the family Osmeridae. It is native to the Pacific coast of North America.

Physical characteristics 
Night smelt are similar in appearance to the longfin smelt (Sprinchus thaleichthys). The maximum length of night smelt is 9 inches. They are bright golden to silvery in color, and give off the distinctive odour of cucumber.

Survival
The night smelt spawns nocturnally, in the surf zone, over coarse sand beaches, from Point Arguello in central California to southeast Alaska. Spawning generally occurs from February through August.

Night smelt are not to be confused with the California grunion (Leuresthes tenuis), an unrelated silverside that also spawns in the surf at night.

Commercial
There is a minor commercial fishery for night smelt over much of its range but night smelt catch is often sold as "whitebait" or "smelt"  in local markets.

Recreation
Recreationally, night smelt are caught in the surf zone by dip net, A-frame net or (rarely) by hook and line.

External links 
UniProt entry
ITIS report

night smelt
Western North American coastal fauna
Fauna of Western Canada
Fish of the Western United States
night smelt